Augusta Charter Township is a charter township of Washtenaw County in the U.S. state of Michigan.  The population was 6,745 at the 2010 census.

Communities
 Eaton Mills is a historic community located within the township.  It was a lumber settlement and was given a post office that operated only briefly from June 24, 1878 until September 30, 1879.
 Fuller is a historic community located within the township, even though its existence precedes the creation of Augusta Township in 1836.  Fuller had a rural post office that operated very briefly from March to May 8, 1832.
The community is centered at the intersection of Whittaker Road and Willis Road near the Lincoln Consolidated School District campus.
 Nelsonville is a former settlement within the southern portion of the township.  It was settled as early as 1831 along the Monroe–Washtenaw county line, and its history is nearly identical to the community of Oakville in Monroe County.  The name Nelsonville came from one of its earliest settlers and first postmaster Ichabod Nelson.  The post office opened on May 7, 1834.  The post office closed occasionally and underwent several name changes, including Nelsonville, Readingville, and ultimately Oakville until it closed permanently on February 19, 1904.  The community of Readingville is historically listed as being in Washtenaw County, while Oakville is in Monroe County.
Andrew Muir was the first settler in the area, and James Miller founded the community in 1829 in what would later become Augusta Township in 1836. The Stony Creek post office was established on July 7, 1862 and remained in operation until July 15, 1905. The community is unrelated to the Stony Creek community in Monroe County, which is located much further downstream along the same creek.
The Willis 48191 ZIP Code serves most of the eastern portion of the township.
The Whittaker 48190 ZIP Code serves the immediate area of the community.

Geography

Paint Creek runs through the township.

Demographics

As of the 2010 census, there were 6,745 people and 2,433 households residing in the township. The racial makeup of the township was 86.5% White, 7.8% African American, 0.33% Native American, 0.6% Asian, 0.8% from other races, and 2.3% from two or more races. Hispanic or Latino of any race were 2.1% of the population.

As of the census of 2000, there were 4,813 people, 1,728 households, and 1,384 families residing in the township. The racial makeup of the township was 92.2% White, 5.3% African American, 0.3% Native American, 0.2% Asian, 0.1% Pacific Islander, 0.2% from other races, and 1.3% from two or more races. Hispanic or Latino of any race were 0.7% of the population.

There were 1,728 households, out of which 34.6% had children under the age of 18 living with them, 68.3% were married couples living together, 7.5% had a female householder with no husband present, and 19.9% were non-families. 16.0% of all households were made up of individuals, and 5.8% had someone living alone who was 65 years of age or older.  The average household size was 2.77 and the average family size was 3.09.

In the township the population was spread out, with 24.9% under the age of 18, 6.9% from 18 to 24, 30.1% from 25 to 44, 27.5% from 45 to 64, and 10.7% who were 65 years of age or older.  The median age was 39 years. For every 100 females, there were 101.0 males.  For every 100 females age 18 and over, there were 99.4 males.

The median income for a household in the township was $65,033, and the median income for a family was $70,444. Males had a median income of $52,367 versus $31,146 for females. The per capita income for the township was $27,509.  About 4.8% of families and 5.4% of the population were below the poverty line, including 1.6% of those under age 18 and 14.2% of those age 65 or over.

Education
Augusta Charter Township is served by two public school districts.  The majority of the township is served by Lincoln Consolidated School District, which is headquartered within the township.  A small southwestern portion of the township is served by Milan Area Schools in the city of Milan.

Images

References

Sources

External links

Augusta Charter Township official website

Townships in Washtenaw County, Michigan
Charter townships in Michigan
1836 establishments in Michigan Territory
Populated places established in 1836